The South African Railways Class 8X 2-8-0 of 1901 was a steam locomotive from the pre-Union era in the Cape of Good Hope.

In 1901 and 1902, the Cape Government Railways placed sixteen 8th Class  Consolidation type steam locomotives in service. In 1912, when they were assimilated into the South African Railways, they were renumbered and designated Class 8X.

Manufacturers
The first 8th Class  Consolidation type locomotive of the Cape Government Railways (CGR) was designed by H.M. Beatty, the Chief Locomotive Superintendent of the CGR from 1896 to 1910. Sixteen of these engines were ordered from the Schenectady Locomotive Works in the United States of America. In 1901, while they were being built, Schenectady merged with seven other American locomotive builders to form the American Locomotive Company (ALCO).

As a result, the first two locomotives, numbered 749 and 750, were built by Schenectady in 1901, while ALCO built the rest in 1902. Of the latter, the first seven were numbered in the range from 351 to 357 and were allocated to the Midland System, while the last seven were numbered in the range from 751 to 757 and joined the two Schenectady-builts on the Western System.

Characteristics
They were conceived as mixed traffic locomotives, equally suitable for goods and passenger work, and had bar frames, narrow fireboxes and used saturated steam. The Type WG bogie tender entered service with these engines.

The locomotive had a copper firebox, with a rocking grate with drop plates and a hopper-style ash-pan. The boiler was equipped with  Ramsbottom safety valves, while its feedwater was supplied by two Cape pattern Gresham & Craven's no. 8 injectors. The engine was equipped with a Nathan double-sight feed cylinder lubricator, Gresham & Craven's patent steam sanding gear and one  and one  Star chime no. 3 whistles.

For improved accessibility, the steam chests were mounted outside the frames instead of between them. The slide valves, operated by Stephenson Link motion, were on top of the cylinders and employed rocker shafts. The balance weight for the Stephenson motion was seldom used on American locomotives and was replaced by a powerful coiled spring.

This was done to accommodate the large firebox with its  firegrate area which had to be installed above instead of between the frames.

A successful smokebox innovation on the 8th Class locomotive was the installation of a petticoat pipe, suspended from the top of the smokebox below the base of the chimney with its bell-shaped bottom end above the blast pipe. Its function was to enhance and equalise the draught through the boiler tubes. The petticoat pipe was new to South Africa. Previously, locomotive builders relied on the length of the chimney to enhance draught, but as boiler sizes increased and chimneys became shorter to remain within loading gauge limitations, the petticoat pipe became vital.

The spark arresters were made from perforated plate, arranged in V-shape and attached to movable wings which were hinged to the blast pipe so that they could be moved aside when the tubes were being cleaned.

The 8th Class proved to be good all-round engines  and were found to be remarkably steady, even at high speed. In comparison to the 7th Class, the 8th Class used less coal in proportion to the tonnage hauled, at a consumption per train-mile of 14.1% in excess of that of the 7th Class, but with a 23% greater load.

Wheel arrangements
Between 1902 and 1904, these  locomotives were followed by several more orders, placed with various manufacturers for similar locomotives for the CGR. While subjecting these first sixteen locomotives to exhaustive testing on all types of traffic and under varying conditions, some trouble was experienced with the leading pony truck.

In the designs of all but two of the subsequent orders for more 8th Class locomotives, the two-wheeled pony truck was replaced by a four-wheeled bogie. Most of the later versions of the locomotive were therefore built with a  Mastodon type wheel arrangement. In spite of the difference, they were all grouped together into the 8th Class by the CGR.

Class 8 sub-classes
When the Union of South Africa was established on 31 May 1910, the three Colonial government railways (CGR, Natal Government Railways and Central South African Railways) were united under a single administration to control and administer the railways, ports and harbours of the Union. Although the South African Railways and Harbours came into existence in 1910, the actual classification and renumbering of all the rolling stock of the three constituent railways were only implemented with effect from 1 January 1912.

In 1912, these sixteen Consolidation types were designated Class 8X on the South African Railways (SAR). They, together with the rest of the CGR’s 8th Class  Consolidation types and 8th Class 4-8-0 Mastodon types, plus the Class 8-L1 to 8-L3  Mastodon type locomotives of the CSAR, were grouped into ten different sub-classes on the SAR. The  locomotives became SAR Classes 8 and 8A to 8F while the  locomotives became Classes 8X to 8Z.

Works numbers
The table lists the locomotive builders, works numbers and the CGR and SAR numbering of the Class 8X locomotives.

Wheel arrangement modification
In 1930, SAR no. 883 was reboilered with a purpose-built boiler and equipped with superheating. At the same time, it was converted to a 4-8-0 Mastodon type wheel arrangement by replacing the leading pony truck with a bogie. The modified locomotive was reclassified and became the sole member of Class 8R.

Service
In SAR service, the Class 8X was employed mainly on the Midland System. The majority of the class were withdrawn by 1937, but no. 894 survived to 1950 before being scrapped. The sole Class 8R 4-8-0 was put to work in the Eastern Transvaal until it was withdrawn from service in 1939.

Illustration

References

1600
1600
2-8-0 locomotives
1D locomotives
Schenectady Locomotive Works locomotives
ALCO locomotives
Cape gauge railway locomotives
Railway locomotives introduced in 1901
1901 in South Africa
Scrapped locomotives